Evgeny Vladimirovich Medvedev (born 27 August 1982) is a Russia professional ice hockey defenseman who is currently an unrestricted free agent. He most recently played under contract with Avangard Omsk of the Kontinental Hockey League (KHL). He previously played one season in the National Hockey League (NHL) for the Philadelphia Flyers.

Playing career
Undrafted in any NHL Entry Draft, Medvedev played in his native Russia making his first team debut with Mechel Chelyabinsk in the Russian Superleague (RSL) in 2002. A season before the introduction of the Kontinental Hockey League (KHL), Medvedev transferred to Ak Bars Kazan in the 2007–08 season.

Medvedev played eight seasons with Kazan, culminating in two Gagarin Cup championships and three KHL All-Star Appearances, before opting to sign his first NHL contract as a 32-year-old on a one-year deal with the Philadelphia Flyers on 20 May 2015.

After one season in North America, Medvedev returned to Russia by signing a contract with Avangard Omsk.

Career statistics

Regular season and playoffs

International

References

External links

1982 births
Living people
Ak Bars Kazan players
Avangard Omsk players
Ice hockey players at the 2014 Winter Olympics
Olympic ice hockey players of Russia
Philadelphia Flyers players
Russian expatriate ice hockey people
Russian expatriate sportspeople in the United States
Russian ice hockey defencemen
Severstal Cherepovets players
Sportspeople from Chelyabinsk
Undrafted National Hockey League players